

Ottoman Empire
 Principality of Abkhazia – Kelesh Begi (1789–1806)

Portugal
 Angola – Fernão António de Noronha, Governor of Angola (1802–1806)
 Macau – Caetano de Sousa Pereira, Governor of Macau (1803–1806)

Spanish Empire
Viceroyalty of New Granada – Antonio José Amar y Borbón, Viceroy of New Granada (1803–1810)
Viceroyalty of New Spain – José de Iturrigaray y Aréstegui, Viceroy of New Spain (1803–1808)
Captaincy General of Cuba – Salvador de Muro y Salazar, Governor of Cuba (1799–1812)
Spanish East Indies – Rafael María de Aguilar y Ponce de León, Governor-General of the Philippines (1793–1806)
Commandancy General of the Provincias Internas – Nemesio Salcedo y Salcedo (1802–1813)
Viceroyalty of Peru – Gabriel de Avilés y del Fierro, Viceroy of Perú (1801–1806)
Captaincy General of Chile – Luis Muñoz de Guzmán, Royal Governor of Chile (1802–1808)
Viceroyalty of the Río de la Plata – Rafael de Sobremonte, Viceroy of the Río de la Plata (1804–1807)

United Kingdom
 Cayman Islands – William Bodden, Chief Magistrate of the Cayman Islands (1776–1823)
 Malta – Alexander Ball, Civil Commissioner of Malta (1802–1809)
 New South Wales – Philip Gidley King, Governor of New South Wales (1800–1806)
Canada – Robert Prescott, Governor-in-Chief of the Canadas, New Brunswick, and Nova Scotia (1796–1814)
Cape Breton Island – John Despard, Lieutenant Governor of Cape Breton Island (1800–1807)
Colony of Newfoundland – Sir Erasmus Gower, Commodore-Governor of Newfoundland (1804–1806)
Prince Edward Island – Joseph Frederick Wallet DesBarres, Governor of Prince Edward Island, (1804–1812)

Colonial governors
Colonial governors
1805